The Odia film industry, colloquially known as Ollywood, is the Odia language Indian film industry, based in Bhubaneshwar and Cuttack in Odisha, India. The name Ollywood is a portmanteau of the words Odia and Hollywood.

Industry
In 1974, the Government of Odisha declared film making and construction of cinema theatres as an industry in the state, and in 1976 it established the Odisha Film Development Corporation in Cuttack.

History
Odisha has a history of filmmaking, starting from 1936. The  first Odia film is Sita Bibaha, made by Mohan Sundar Deb Goswami in 1936. Drawn from the Indian epic Ramayana, the story is about the marriage of Sita and Ram. The film plot was made from a drama written by Kamapala Mishra. Prepared with a budget of only Rs 30,000, the film has 14 song sequences. Despite it being the first Odia film with several drawbacks in every section of its making, the two-hour-long movie generated great enthusiasm among the people. It was released in Laksmi Talkies, Puri. The 12-reeled film had in its cast Makhanlal Banerjee (Ram), who received only Rs 120 for his performance, Aditya Ballav Mohanty (Lakhsman), who got only Rs 35 as conveyance allowance, and Prabati Devi (Sita), who was paid the highest amount of Rs 150. This was a landmark film of the Odia film Industry.

The pace of Odia film production in the initial years was very slow. After Sita Bibaha, only two films were produced until 1951. A joint consortium of landlords and businessmen who collected funds after 1948 produced those two movies. The 1951 production Roles Two Eight was the first Odia film with an English name. It was released 15 years after the first Odia film, Sita Bibaha. It was the fourth Odia film produced by Ratikant Padhi.

The eleventh Odia film, Sri Lokanath, was directed by Prafulla Sengupta and received the National Award in 1960.

The same year, Prasanta Nanda won the National Film Award for Best Feature Film in Odia for his debut film, Nua Bou. His name would always be synonymous with the Odia film industry. He was present in Odia films since 1959, but he became very active only after 1976. Nanda was an actor, director, screenplay writer, lyricist and  playback singer. Nanda won National Awards three times, in 1960, 1966 and 1969 for his acting in Nua Bou, Matir Manisha and Adina Megha.

Mohammad Mohsin started the revolution in the Odia film industry by not only securing the essence of the Odia culture but also changing the way the film industry watched Odia movies. Phoola Chandana was written by Ananda Sankar Das. He belongs to Cuttack. His movies heralded the golden era of the Odia film industry by bringing in freshness to Odia movies. His directorial debut was Phoola Chandana for which he won the Odisha State Film Award for Best Director. He had to his credit 16 box office successful movies in his directorial stint. He started as an actor in character roles and gave household names like Raaka to Odisha.

Amiya Ranjan Patnaik, who started his career directing Mamata Mage Mula, changed the dimension of the Odia film industry by producing big budget movies with multiple star casts, which was a new trend at that time. He introduced many newcomers, musicians, technicians and singers from Mumbai and Chennai. He also produced the National Award-winning film Hakim Babu in 1985, directed by Pranab Das. His film Pua Mora Kala Thakura, directed by Raju Mishra, was one of the biggest successes in the Odia film industry, followed by Chaka Aakhi Sabu Dekhuchi and Asuchi Mo Kalia Suna. He frequently collaborated with Raju Mishra, Akshaya Mohanty, Bijay Mohanty and Uttam Mohanty. He started the trend of producing trilingual films in the Odia film industry. Raja Rani, Paradeshi Babu and Parimahal were made in Odia, Bengali and Bangladeshi. He made a comeback as a director and made Tulasi Apa produced by his son Anupam Patnaik. Tulasi Apa was a critical success within many international festivals. This was the first biopic of Odisha based on Padmashree Tulasi Munda.

Uttam Mohanty, whose debut film Abhiman won accolades, was very successful in the 1980s. His wife Aparajita Mohanty is also an actress.  Critics have named Bijay Mohanty and Mihir Das to be two of the best Odia actors so far 80'and 90's. In 1990s Siddhanta Mahapatra, a new generation star, with his action and comedy movies gave national recognition to odiya industry. Actress Nandita Das, who acted in several Hindi movies like Fire, has an Odia origin. She acted in the Susanta Misra-directed Biswaprakash, which won a National Award in 2000.Barsha Priyadarshini is also another successful actress in the millennium era of Odia cinema. Anubhab Mohanty is a well-known name in Ollywood, famous for his action and romantic movies.
Mrinal Sen directed an Odia film, Matira Manisha, which won a National Film Award for Best Feature Film in Odia to Prashanta Nanda.

Notable people

Actors

 Bijay Mohanty
 Uttam Mohanty
 Siddhanta Mahapatra
 Anubhav Mohanty
 Arindam Roy
 Babushaan Mohanty
 Akash Das Nayak
 Samaresh Routray
 Sritam Das
 Dukhiram Swain
 Jayiram Samal
 Mihir Das
 Hara Patnaik
 Kuna Tripathy
 Papu Pam Pam
 Harihara Mahapatra
 Prasanta Nanda
 Sabyasachi Mishra
 Sadhu Meher
 Sarat Pujari
 Sriram Panda
 Rabi Mishra

Actresses

 Anu Chowdhury
 Aparajita Mohanty
 Archita Sahu 
 Barsha Priyadarshini
 Bhanumati Devi
 
 Elina Samantray
 Kavya Keeran
 Mahasweta Ray
 Naina Das
 Nandita Das
 Prakruti Mishra
 Rachana Banerjee
 Rajeswari Ray
 Riya Dey
 Tandra Ray
 Tamanna Vyas 
 Pupul Bhuyan

Directors

 Manmohan Mahapatra
 Ashok Pati
 Bijaya Jena
 Biswanath Rath
 Chittaranjan Tripathy
 Hara Patnaik
 Mohammad Mohsin
 Nila Madhab Panda
 Nirad N. Mohapatra
 Mehmood Hussain
 Prashant Nanda
 Ravi Kinagi
 Sabyasachi Mohapatra
 Sanjay Nayak
 Sisir Mishra
 Susant Mani
 Raju Mishra

Music directors

 Akshaya Mohanty
 Prafulla Kar
 Bhubaneswar Mishra
 Balakrushna Das
 Upendra Kumar
 Amarendra Mohanty
 Raju Mishra
 Sarat Nayak
 Prem Anand
 Goodli Rath
 Abhijit Majumdar

Screenwriters
 Subodh Patnaik

Singers

 Aarti Mukherjee
 Akshaya Mohanty
 Bhikari Bal
 Prafulla Kar
 Raghunath Panigrahi
 Balakrushna Das
 Shyamamani Pattnaik
 Ananya Nanda
 Anuradha Paudwal
 Babul Supriyo
 Babushan
 Biswajit Mohapatra
 Diptirekha Padhi
 Humane Sagar 
 Kuldeep Pattanaik
 Krishna Beura
 Mohammad Aziz
 Rituraj Mohanty
 S. Janaki
 Sarbeswar Bhoi
 Sohini Mishra
 Suresh Wadkar
 Udit Narayan
 Vani Jairam

Art directors 
 Asim Basu
 Nikhil Baran Sengupta

Awards
 Odisha State Film Awards
 National Film Award for Best Feature Film in Odia
 National Film Award for Best Supporting Actress (1987) - Manjula Kanwar for  Bhanga Silata
 National Film Award for Best Child Artist (1994) - Tarasankar Misra for Lavanya Preethi
 Filmfare Awards East

See also
 List of Oriya films

Citations

General sources 
  Contains information on films from 1934 to 1984.

External links
 Orissa: Seventy-Five Years of Oriya Cinema
 https://archive.today/2013.06.24-210753/http://www.odishaglitz.com/events-news/ups-and-downs-in-odia-cinema-telaram-meher-phd-research-scholar.html
 https://archive.today/2013.06.24-210811/http://www.odishaglitz.com/events-news/ufo-theatre-list-in-odisha.html